Mobeytiheh-ye Do (also Romanized as Mobeyţīḩeh-ye Do and Mobeyţīḩeh-e Do; also known as Mobeyţīḩeh, Mobeyţīḩeh-e Do Mīzbān, and Mobitihehé Dow Mizban) is a village in Elhayi Rural District, in the Central District of Ahvaz County, Khuzestan Province, Iran. At the 2006 census, its population was 60, in 11 families.

References 

Populated places in Ahvaz County